Zoltán Szilárd (10 October 1930 – 19 March 2015) was a Hungarian swimmer. He competed in the men's 100 metre freestyle at the 1948 Summer Olympics.

References

External links
 

1930 births
2015 deaths
Hungarian male swimmers
Olympic swimmers of Hungary
Swimmers at the 1948 Summer Olympics
Swimmers from Budapest
Hungarian male freestyle swimmers